Renatus Bellott (died 1709) was a Member of Parliament for the rotten borough of Mitchell in Cornwall from 1702 to 1705. He was the owner of the barton of Bochym on the Lizard Peninsula.

His wife was Mary. the daughter of Edmund Spoure and Mary née Rodd. On her father's death she inherited the barton of Trebartha. They had one son, named after his father, who died in 1712 at the age of eight. Renatus Bellott died of fever in 1709 and Bochym was sold to George Robinson, Esq. to pay off debts.

References

17th-century births
1709 deaths
English MPs 1702–1705
Members of the pre-1707 English Parliament for constituencies in Cornwall
People from Cornwall